William Faulkner was an American author.

Faulkner may also refer to:
Faulkner (surname), an English surname (and list of people with that name)
Faulkner (band), an alternative band 
Faulkner County, Arkansas, a county in the United States
Faulkner, Maryland, an unincorporated location in the United States
Faulkner, West Virginia
Faulkner University, a university in Montgomery, Alabama, United States

See also
 Falcone (disambiguation)
 Falconer (disambiguation)
 Falkner (disambiguation)
 Faulkner Act (Council-Manager), a Faulkner Act form
 Faulkner Act (Mayor-Council), a Faulkner Act form
 Faulkner Act (Mayor-Council-Administrator), a Faulkner Act form
 Faulkner Act (New Jersey), a New Jersey municipal charter law, named after Bayard H. Faulkner
 Faulkner Act (Small Municipality), a Faulkner Act form
 Faulkner-Blanchard, a 1910 automobile
 Faulkner Homestead, a 1707 historic house in Acton, Massachusetts, United States
 Faulkner Hospital, a teaching hospital in Boston, Massachusetts, United States
 Faulkner ministry, sixth Government or Executive Committee of the Privy Council of Northern Ireland, ruled between March 1971 and March 1972
 Faulkner State Community College, a public college in Baldwin County, Alabama, United States
 Faulknor (disambiguation)
 Faux Faulkner contest, a parody competition in which entrants mimic William Faulkner's writing style
 Fawkner (disambiguation)
 Motte v. Faulkner, a 1735 lawsuit over the publishing rights of Jonathan Swift's works 
 PEN/Faulkner Award for Fiction, an American literary award first awarded in 1981
 William Faulkner Foundation award, an American literary award first awarded in 1961